African Christian Union was an organization proposed in Natal by Joseph Booth in 1896 to establish industrial missions that were intended to be the initial phase of a vast programme of African development, managed by Africans. The proposal was seriously discussed by Zulu leaders, however was ultimately rejected.

References

Religious organisations based in South Africa
African and Black nationalist organizations in Africa